Charles Rutland Gardner (born September 30, 1944) is a retired professional basketball power forward who played one season in the American Basketball Association (ABA) as a member of the Denver Rockets during the 1967–68 season. Born in Lincoln, Nebraska, he attended the University of Colorado where he was drafted in the ninth round of the 1966 NBA draft by the Baltimore Bullets.

External links

1944 births
Living people
American men's basketball players
Baltimore Bullets (1963–1973) draft picks
Basketball players from Nebraska
Colorado Buffaloes men's basketball players
Denver Rockets players
Power forwards (basketball)
Sportspeople from Lincoln, Nebraska
Pennsbury High School alumni